Erdin Demir (born 27 March 1990 as Erdin Demirovski) is a Swedish former professional footballer who played as a left back. He played in Sweden, Norway, and Belgium during a career that spanned between 2008 and 2021. A full international between 2012 and 2014, he won six caps for the Sweden national team.

Career

Sweden
Demir played youth football with Malmö FF, making his professional debut in the Svenska Cupen against Kristianstad. He scored the first goal in what would become a 3–2 win to Malmö. A move to LB07 was next as it became apparent he would not break into the Malmö first team. At the start of 2011, Demir moved back into the Allsvenskan with Trelleborg. Despite finishing fifteenth and in a relegation spot, he was nominated for Allsvenskan Newcomer of the Year. His impressive season attracted interest from Swedish side Djurgården and unnamed teams in Turkey, the country of his origins.

Brann
On 6 December 2011, Demir signed with Norwegian club Brann for around five million Swedish kronor. His contract will run until the end of the 2015 Tippeligaen season. Former Brann striker and Trelleborg team mate of Demir Joakim Sjöhage described the young Swede as "a modern full-back," continuing to say that "he is good offensively and stable defensively. He came as a new signing to Trelleborg, but was consistently one of the best in the team."

During the mid-season break in his first season in Norway, Demir spoke of how he wished to use the autumn as a new start. On his first six months, he said, "I got a good start in pre-season. It created high expectations, then I had a less than fortunate start to the league. I received a lot of criticism. As with everyone else who receives that, it hit my self-confidence." He justified his slow start by saying, "I was bought as an offensive full back, to help with attack. You must be aware that there will be space behind me." His coach, Rune Skarsfjord was in agreement that "[Erdin] is unfinished," but is confident that he'll "grow" defensively.

Belgium and retirement 
He retired from professional football in early 2022, after having played in Belgium since 2015.

International career
Demir has played seven games for the Sweden under-21 team. In his four appearances during the 2013 European Under-21 Championship qualification he has assisted four goals, the equal most of any player.

On 14 December 2011, Erik Hamrén called Demir up to the Swedish national side for two friendly matches against Qatar and Bahrain. His debut came against the former on 23 January 2012, in which he received very positive reviews.

Career statistics

References

External links 
 

1990 births
Living people
Swedish people of Turkish descent
Association football fullbacks
Swedish footballers
Sweden youth international footballers
Sweden under-21 international footballers
Sweden international footballers
Swedish expatriate footballers
Allsvenskan players
Eliteserien players
Norwegian First Division players
SK Brann players
Malmö FF players
Trelleborgs FF players
IF Limhamn Bunkeflo (men) players
S.K. Beveren players
S.V. Zulte Waregem players
Belgian Pro League players
Expatriate footballers in Belgium
Swedish expatriate sportspeople in Belgium
Expatriate footballers in Norway
Swedish expatriate sportspeople in Norway
Footballers from Malmö